Department of Environment is a department jurisdicted by Government of West Bengal. It was establisted  in 1982. The department is headed by a Minister in Charge, with Principal Secretary as administrative head. Their vision is - ” Building Environment Smart and Climate Change Resilient West Bengal”.

Ministrial Team and Activities
The activities of the department include: 

Preservation of environment and ecology.
Prevention and control of pollution of air, water and land.
Co-ordination between departments and agencies of the State and the Union Government concerned with the policies and schemes relating to environment.
Acting as the nodal department for climate change related activities in the state of West Bengal.

The current Minister in charge is Somen Mahapatra.

References 

Government departments of West Bengal
West Bengal